Hygroplasta monila is a moth of the family Lecithoceridae. It was first described by Chun-Sheng Wu and Kyu-Tek Park in 1998. It is found in Sri Lanka.

The wingspan is about 16 mm. The forewings are brown with dark brown medium-sized discal spots. The pre-apical line is light ochreous, angled inward at one-third. The hindwings are light brown.

Etymology
The species name is derived from Latin monile (meaning necklace).

References

Moths described in 1998
Hygroplasta